Khirbet Tana et-Tahta is an archeological site located in the West Bank. It lies near the Israeli settlement of Mekhora.

Biblical identification 
Khirbet Tana et-Tahta is identified with Taanath Shiloh, a place mentioned in the Hebrew Bible as one of the landmarks on the boundary of Tribe of Ephraim. Taanath Shiloh was previously identified with the nearby site of Khirbet Tana et-Foqa, but based on archeological evidence, Tana et-Tahta seems like the more probable candidate.

Yanun, believed by some archeologists to be the location of biblical Janohah, lies nearby.

Archeology 
The site was surveyed by the Manasseh Hill Country Survey and no orderly excavation was conducted. The survey documented the remains of a multi-period settlement that was proposed to be identified with the biblical town of Taanath Shiloh and with Thena, a city mentioned in several sources from the Roman and Byzantine periods.

In his Onomasticon, Eusebius mentions a place called Thena on the road to the Jordan river, around 10 milestones east of Neapolis. Ptolemy describes Thena, as a town in Samaria.

The remains of the Roman-Byzantine city covered an area of over 100 dunams across the summit and also on the slope north of it. The ethnic identity of its residents remains unclear; it is believed that they were Samaritans or that it had a mixed population of Samaritans and other ethnicities.

Significant remains at the site include a public structure (maybe a Samaritan synagogue), several underground systems, burial caves and a water supply system which has its origins in the Ein al-Foqa spring. The remains of a Roman road have been also discovered near Khirbet Tana et-Tahta; the location of several Iron Age sites nearby suggests that the road dates back to biblical times.

References 

Archaeological sites in the West Bank
Ancient Samaritan settlements